Jackie Cochran may refer to:

Jacqueline Cochran (1906–1980), female pioneer American aviator
Jackie Lee Cochran (1934–1998), male American rockabilly musician

See also
John Cochran (disambiguation)